Floodability may refer to one of the following.

Floodability (ship), a characteristic of the construction of a ship to resist flooding. 
The risk of flooding of land areas or the degree of this risk.